The 2014 SABA Championship is the 3rd SABA Championship, and the qualifying event in the South Asia Basketball Association subzone, one of the FIBA Asia's subzone for the 2014 FIBA Asia Cup. The games were held from May 13 to May 17 in Kathmandu, Nepal.

India won their second SABA title after sweeping the whole tournament, thus clinching the lone spot for SABA in the 2014 FIBA Asia Cup.

Round robin

Final standings

Awards

References

 [1]SABA Championship: Nepal off to a winning start against Maldives
 [2]SABA Championship: Bangladesh defeat Sri Lanka
 [3]SABA Championship: Nepal suffer defeat by Sri Lanka
 https://web.archive.org/web/20160622183228/http://arkonetwork.com/sport/basketball/saba-championship-india-prove-far-too-superior-for-bangladesh/
 https://web.archive.org/web/20160622183344/http://arkonetwork.com/sport/basketball/saba-championship-india-repeat-their-feat-with-the-defeat-of-sri-lanka/
 https://web.archive.org/web/20160622183123/http://arkonetwork.com/sport/basketball/saba-championship-bangladesh-earn-a-tough-win-over-maldives/
 https://web.archive.org/web/20160813040719/http://arkonetwork.com/sport/basketball/saba-championship-india-on-route-to-the-fiba-asian-championships/
 https://web.archive.org/web/20160602232012/http://arkonetwork.com/sport/basketball/saba-championship-sri-lanka-guarantee-third-place-finish/
 https://web.archive.org/web/20160813030654/http://arkonetwork.com/sport/basketball/saba-championship-india-crowned-champions-for-the-second-time/
 https://web.archive.org/web/20160813032202/http://arkonetwork.com/sport/basketball/saba-championship-nepal-tumble-to-fourth-spot-with-a-defeat-by-bangladesh/

2014
2013–14 in Asian basketball
2014 in Nepalese sport
May 2014 sports events in Asia
International basketball competitions hosted by Nepal